Schöffengrund is a municipality in the Lahn-Dill-Kreis in Hesse, Germany.

Geography

Location
Schöffengrund lies only a few kilometres south of Wetzlar in the Hochtaunus Nature Park.

Neighbouring communities
Schöffengrund borders in the north on the towns of Solms and Wetzlar, in the east on the community of Hüttenberg (all three in the Lahn-Dill-Kreis), in the southeast on the community of Langgöns (Gießen district), in the south on the community of Waldsolms, and in the west on the town of Braunfels (both in the Lahn-Dill-Kreis).

Constituent communities
The community consists of the centres of Laufdorf, Niederquembach, Niederwetz, Oberquembach, Oberwetz and Schwalbach.

History
As part of Hesse's municipal reforms, the communities of Schwalbach, Laufdorf, Niederquembach, Niederwetz, Oberquembach and Oberwetz merged on 1 January 1972 and chose the historic name Schöffengrund, which does back to the old court region, the so-called "Quembacher Gericht", which was held at the "stone" near Oberquembach. This was where the Schöffen ("jurymen") from distinguished families in the villages that belonged to the court met for the court's sittings. Grund is German for "ground".

Politics

Municipal council

The municipal elections in 2011 yielded the following results:

Note: FWG and UWG are citizens' coalitions.

Partnerships
The community of Schöffengrund maintains partnerships with the following places:
  Chauray in the département of Deux-Sèvres, France since 1990
  Langewiesen, Thuringia since 1992.

References

External links

Lahn-Dill-Kreis